Proto-Oceanic (abbr. POc) is a proto-language that historical linguists since Otto Dempwolff have reconstructed as the hypothetical common ancestor of the Oceanic subgroup of the Austronesian language family. Proto-Oceanic is a descendant of the Proto-Austronesian language (PAN), the common ancestor of the Austronesian languages.

Proto-Oceanic was probably spoken around the late 3rd millennium BCE in the Bismarck Archipelago, east of Papua New Guinea. Archaeologists and linguists currently agree that its community more or less coincides with the Lapita culture.

Linguistic characteristics
The methodology of comparative linguistics, together with the relative homogeneity of Oceanic languages, make it possible to reconstruct with reasonable certainty the principal linguistic properties of their common ancestor, Proto-Oceanic. Like all scientific hypotheses, these reconstructions must be understood as obviously reflecting the state of science at a particular moment in time; the detail of these reconstructions is still the object of much discussion among Oceanicist scholars.

Phonology
The phonology of POc can be reconstructed with reasonable certainty.
Proto-Oceanic had five vowels:  *i, *e, *a, *o, *u, with no length contrast.

Twenty-three consonants are reconstructed. When the conventional transcription of a protophoneme differs from its value in the IPA, the latter is indicated:

Based on evidence from the Southern Oceanic and Micronesian languages, Lynch (2003) proposes that the bilabial series may have been phonetically realized as palatalized:   .

Basic word order
Many Oceanic languages of New Guinea, Vanuatu, the Solomon Islands, and Micronesia are SVO, or verb-medial, languages. SOV, or verb-final, word order is considered to be typologically unusual for Austronesian languages, and is only found in some Oceanic languages of New Guinea and to a more limited extent, the Solomon Islands. This is because SOV word order is very common in some non-Austronesian Papuan languages in contact with Oceanic languages. In turn, most Polynesian languages, and several languages of New Caledonia, have the VSO word order. Whether Proto-Oceanic had SVO or VSO is still debatable.

Lexicon

Since the mid-1990s, reconstructing the lexicon of Proto-Oceanic has been the object of the Oceanic Lexicon Project, by scholars Andrew Pawley, Malcolm Ross and Meredith Osmond. This encyclopedic project has produced 5 volumes so far, available in open access.

In addition, Robert Blust also includes Proto-Oceanic in his Austronesian Comparative Dictionary (abbr. ACD).

Animal names

Selected reconstructed Proto-Oceanic terms of various animals from Blust's ACD:

Fishes
{| class="wikitable sortable"
! Proto-Oceanic !! Common name !! Scientific name
|-
| *bubu₇ || triggerfish || Balistes sp.
|-
| *sumu || triggerfish || Balistidae
|-
| *sulik || a fish, the fusilier || Caesionidae sp.
|-
| *tipi-tipi || butterflyfish || Chaetodon spp.
|-
| *taŋapa || wrasse || Cheilinus spp.
|-
| *bolo bolo || small dark surgeonfish || possibly Ctenochaetus
|-
| *komi || suckerfish / remora || Echeneis naucrates; hold on by biting
|-
| *kamaRi || a fish, the rainbow runner || Elagatis bipinnulata
|-
| *piRu-piRu || sailfish || Istiophoridae
|-
| *kulabo || a fish || Lethrinidae spp.
|-
| *sabutu; *surup₂; *susul₁; *kasika || a fish, the emperor || Lethrinus spp.
|-
| *tasiwa || sea perch || Lutjanus sp.
|-
| *pu-pulan || a white fish, the tarpon; herring || Megalops cyprinoides
|-
| *tiqo || goatfish || family Mullidae
|-
| *mwanoRe || unicornfish || Naso unicornis
|-
| *taRa || short snouted unicornfish || Naso spp.
|-
| *lau || a fish, the banded sweetlips || Plectorhinchus spp.
|-
| *lio-lio || brown triggerfish || Pseudobalistes fuscus
|-
| *kitoŋ || rabbitfish || Siganus punctatus (family Siganidae)
|-
| *palaja || rabbitfish || Siganus sp.
|-
| *takua || yellowfin tuna || Thunnus albacares
|-
| *piRa₂ || sailfin tang || Zebrasoma veliferum
|}

Birds
{| class="wikitable sortable"
! Proto-Oceanic !! Common name !! Scientific name
|-
| *pusiRa || starling || Aplonis spp.
|-
| *kaRa || male eclectus parrot || Eclectus roratus
|-
| *kao || heron || probably Egretta sp.
|-
| *kiki₁ || kingfisher || Halcyon spp.
|-
| *kikau, *kipau || Bismarck scrub fowl || Megapodius eremita
|-
| *sau || a bird, the Golden Whistler || Pachycephala spp.
|-
| *takere || a bird, the fantail || Rhipidura sp.
|-
| *bune || fruit dove || probably Treron spp.
|-
| *pwirip || parrot || probably Trichoglossus sp.
|}

Other animals
{| class="wikitable sortable"
! Proto-Oceanic !! Common name !! Scientific name
|-
| *poñu || the green turtle || Chelonia mydas
|-
| *kasi || to scrape; scraper or grater made from circular bivalve shell || Asaphis spp.
|-
| *buliq₁ || cowrie shell || Cypraea mauritiana
|-
| *sapulu || bivalve mollusc || possibly Pinna sp.
|}

Plant names

Pawley and Ross (2006)
Reconstructed Proto-Oceanic terms for horticulture and food plants (other than coconuts):

Tubers and their culture

{| 
! Proto-Oceanic !! Meaning
|-
| *mwapo(q) || taro (possibly all Araceae)
|-
| *talo(s) || taro, Colocasia esculenta
|-
| *piRaq || giant taro, elephant ear taro, Alocasia macrorrhiza
|-
| *bulaka || swamp taro, Cyrtosperma merkusii
|-
| *kamwa || kind of wild taro (?)
|-
| *qupi || greater yam, Dioscorea alata; yam (generic)
|-
| *pwatik || potato yam, aerial yam, Dioscorea bulbifera
|-
| *(s,j)uli(q) || banana or taro sucker, slip, cutting, shoot (i.e. propagation material)
|-
| *wasi(n) || taro stem (used for planting)
|-
| *bwaŋo || new leaves or shoots, or taro tops for planting
|-
| *up(e,a) || taro seedling
|-
| *pasoq[-i] || to plant (tubers)
|-
| *kotiŋ || to cut off taro tops
|}

Bananas

{| 
! Proto-Oceanic !! Meaning
|-
| *pudi || banana, Musa cultivars
|-
| *joRaga || banana, Australimusa group
|-
| *sakup || kind of cooking banana: long with white flesh (presumably Eumusa group)
|}

Other food plants

{| 
! Proto-Oceanic !! Meaning
|-
| *topu || sugar cane, Saccharum officinarum
|-
| *pijo || a kind of edible wild cane or a reed, Saccharum spontaneum
|-
| *[ka]timun || cucurbit (generic); cucumber, Cucumis sativus
|-
| *laqia || ginger, Zingiber officinale
|-
| *yaŋo || turmeric, Curcuma longa
|-
| *kuluR || breadfruit, Artocarpus altilis
|-
| *baReqo || breadfruit fruit (?)
|-
| *padran || pandanus (generic); coastal pandanus, Pandanus tectorius
|-
| *kiRe || coastal pandanus, Pandanus tectorius
|-
| *pakum || Pandanus dubius
|-
| *ima || kind of pandanus with useful leaves
|-
| *Rabia || sago, Metroxylon spp., mainly Metroxylon sagu
|-
| *sag(u) || sago starch
|-
| *qatop || sago fronds, thatch
|-
| *talise || Java almond, Indian almond, Terminalia catappa
|-
| *qipi || Tahitian chestnut, Pacific chestnut, Inocarpus fagifer
|-
| *[ka]ŋaRi || canarium almond, Canarium spp.
|-
| *molis || citrus fruit or citrus-like fruit
|-
| *pau(q) || mango, probably Mangifera indica
|-
| *wai, *waiwai || mango (generic)
|-
| *kapika || Malay apple and rose apple, Eugenia spp.
|-
| *ñonum || Morinda citrifolia
|-
| *tawan || Pometia pinnata
|-
| *wasa || edible greens, Abelmoschus manihot
|-
| *m(w)asoku || wild cinnamon, Cinnamomum spp.
|-
| *quRis || Polynesian plum, hog plum, Tahitian apple, Spondias cytherea
|-
| *ñatu(q) || kind of tree with avocado-like fruit and hard wood, Burckella obovata
|-
| *raqu(p) || New Guinea walnut, Dracontomelon dao
|-
| *buaq || areca palm, Areca catechu
|}

Gardening practices

{| 
! Proto-Oceanic !! Meaning
|-
| *quma || garden
|-
| *tanoq || soil, earth
|-
| *poki || to clear ground for planting
|-
| *sara || to dig a hole
|-
| *tanum[-i] || to plant
|}

Ross (2008)
Reconstructed plant terms from Malcolm Ross (2008):

Proto-Oceanic plant terms inherited from Proto-Austronesian or Proto-Malayo-Polynesian (65 reconstructions)

{| class="wikitable sortable"
! Proto-Oceanic !! Meaning
|-
| *[a]ñuliŋ || Pisonia sp.
|-
| *aRu || a shore tree, Casuarina equisetifolia
|-
| *bai-bai(t) || a cycad, Cycas rumphii
|-
| *[baR]baR || coral tree, Erythrina variegata
|-
| *bitu(ŋ) || bamboo sp.
|-
| *botu(ŋ) || large bamboo, presumably Bambusa sp.
|-
| *buaq || betelnut, areca nut, palm, Areca catechu
|-
| *drokol || small Dillenia sp.
|-
| *droRu(ŋ) || Trema orientalis
|-
| *guRu(n) || sword grass, Imperata cylindrica
|-
| *[ja]latoŋ || Laportea and Dendrocnide spp.
|-
| *kanawa(n) || Cordia subcordata
|-
| *[ka]tim(o,u)n || Cucumis spp. (generic?); cucumber, Cucumis sativus
|-
| *kati(p)al || a palm with black wood, Caryota sp.
|-
| *kayu || tree or shrub: generic name for plants with woody stems and branches, probably not including palms or tree-ferns; wood, stick
|-
| *kiRe || coastal Pandanus sp., probably Pandanus tectorius
|-
| *kulapu(R) || Dillenia schlechteri
|-
| *kuluR || breadfruit, Artocarpus altilis
|-
| *laqia || ginger, Zingiber officinale (?)
|-
| *m(ʷ)aso(q)u || wild cinnamon, Cinnamomum sp., probably Cinnamomum xanthoneuron; possibly also Cananga odorata
|-
| *malo || paper mulberry, Broussonetia papyrifera; barkcloth, loincloth
|-
| *naRa || Pterocarpus indicus
|-
| *ñatuq || Burckella obovata
|-
| *nini(q) || shrub, Donax cannaeformis
|-
| *nipaq || Nypa fruticans
|-
| *niuR || coconut palm and/or fruit, Cocos nucifera
|-
| *nunuk || fig trees, Ficus taxon
|-
| *ŋiRac || Pemphis acidula
|-
| *p(ʷ)atoRu || a cycad, Cycas rumphii
|-
| *padran || coastal pandanus, Pandanus tectorius; pandanus (generic)
|-
| *pali[s,j]i || generic term for grasses and other grass-like plants
|-
| *(p,b)anaRo || Thespesia populnea
|-
| *para(k) || Zingiberaceae spp. with edible rhizomes
|-
| *paRu || Hibiscus tiliaceus
|-
| *pila(q)u || Casuarina equisetifolia
|-
| *pinu(q)an || Macaranga spp., perhaps Macaranga involucrata
|-
| *piRaq || giant taro, elephant ear taro, Alocasia macrorrhizos
|-
| *piRu(q) || fan palm, Licuala sp.
|-
| *pitaquR || Calophyllum inophyllum
|-
| *pudi || banana, Musa cultivars
|-
| *[pu-]pulu || betel pepper, Piper betle
|-
| *puna || vine used for fish poison, probably Derris elliptica
|-
| *putun || Barringtonia asiatica
|-
| *qa(l,R)a || Ficus sp.
|-
| *qaramʷaqi || Pipturus argenteus
|-
| *qasam || fern used for tying and binding, Lygodium circinnatum
|-
| *(qate-)qate || Wedelia biflora
|-
| *qauR || bamboo spp.
|-
| *qipil || a taxon of hardwood trees including Intsia bijuga and Casuarina equisetifolia
|-
| *qu(w)e || rattan, Calamus spp.
|-
| *qupi || greater yam, Dioscorea alata: yam (generic)
|-
| *Rabia || sago, Metroxylon spp., mainly Metroxylon sagu (syn. Metroxylon rumphii)
|-
| *raqu(p) || New Guinea walnut, Dracontomelon dao
|-
| *rarap || coral tree, Erythrina spp.
|-
| *talise || Terminalia catappa
|-
| *talo(s) || taro, Colocasia esculenta
|-
| *toŋoR || mangrove, Bruguiera spp.; mangroves (generic)
|-
| *topu || sugarcane, Saccharum officinarum
|-
| *toRas || a taxon of hardwood trees including Intsia bijuga (?)
|-
| *tui || Dolichandrone spathacea
|-
| *tupa || climbing shrubs, Derris spp.
|-
| *wai, *waiwai || mango (generic)
|-
| *walasi || tree sp. with poisonous sap, Semecarpus forstenii
|-
| *waR[e] || Flagellaria indica
|-
| *waRoc || generic term for vines and creepers, plants with creeping or climbing growth structure; string, rope
|}

Proto-Oceanic plant terms inherited from Proto-Central-Eastern Malayo-Polynesian (11 reconstructions)

{| class="wikitable sortable"
! Proto-Oceanic !! Meaning
|-
| *[bual]bual || species of palm used for making spears and bows; palm-wood spear or bow, probably Caryota sp.
|-
| *dalo || Calophyllum inophyllum
|-
| *dradrap || Hoya sp.
|-
| *ima || Pandanus sp. with useful leaves
|-
| *jasi || Cordia subcordata
|-
| *kai(k) || Albizia sp.
|-
| *[ka]ŋaRi || canarium almond, Canarium indicum
|-
| *lowaŋa || Litsea sp.
|-
| *pail || Falcataria moluccana
|-
| *pau(q) || mango, Mangifera sp. (not Mangifera indica)
|-
| *Reqi || sword grass, Imperata cylindrica
|}

Proto-Oceanic plant terms inherited from Proto-Eastern Malayo-Polynesian (4 reconstructions)

{| class="wikitable sortable"
! Proto-Oceanic !! Meaning
|-
| *na[su]-nasu || Scaevola taccada
|-
| *qayawan || Ficus, strangler fig taxon
|-
| *tawan || Pometia pinnata
|-
| *tuRi-tuRi || candlenut tree, Aleurites moluccanus (?)
|}

Reconstructed terms with no external cognates

Proto-Oceanic plant terms with no known non-Oceanic cognates (97 reconstructions)

{| class="wikitable sortable"
! Proto-Oceanic !! Meaning
|-
| *ba(k,g)a || banyan tree, medium-sized Ficus spp., not stranglers
|-
| *babak || Falcataria moluccana
|-
| *bala || taxon including various Euodia spp. (?)
|-
| *baqun || banana cultivar
|-
| *baReko || breadfruit
|-
| *bau || hardwood taxon
|-
| *bele || Abelmoschus manihot
|-
| *beta || breadfruit
|-
| *biRi-biRi || Hernandia nymphaefolia
|-
| *bosi || a forest tree with white wood, probably Euodia elleryana
|-
| *bou || Fagraea spp.
|-
| *bulu || Garcinia sp., perhaps Garcinia novo-guineensis
|-
| *b(ʷ)ala || tree fern, Cycas or Cyathea sp.
|-
| *bʷau || bamboo
|-
| *bʷele || bamboo sp.
|-
| *bʷera || Musa cultivar
|-
| *drala || shrub sp., Vitex trifolia
|-
| *(dr,d)aRa(q,k)a || wild nutmeg, Myristica sp.
|-
| *i(u)bu || Corynocarpus cribbianus
|-
| *iguRa || Ficus sp. with sandpapery leaves, either Ficus copiosa or Ficus wassa or both
|-
| *ipi || Tahitian chestnut, Inocarpus fagifer
|-
| *jajal || croton, Codiaeum variegatum
|-
| *jamaR || Commersonia bartramia
|-
| *jiRi || taxon consisting of Cordyline fruticosa and Dracaena angustifolia
|-
| *joRaga || banana, Fei (?) cultivars
|-
| *ka(mʷa)-kamʷa || Ficus sp., perhaps Ficus nodosa
|-
| *ka[(r,l)a]qabusi || Acalypha spp.
|-
| *kalaka || Planchonella sp.
|-
| *kapika || Malay apple, rose apple, Syzygium malaccense
|-
| *karagʷam || seaweed, seagrass
|-
| *kaRi(q)a || taxon of decorative plants
|-
| *kaRi(q)ana || Pandanus lamekotensis
|-
| *kayu qone || Heritiera littoralis
|-
| *koka || Macaranga spp.
|-
| *koma(r,R)(o,u) || Endospermum sp.
|-
| *kopu || bamboo sp.
|-
| *koRa || wild mango, Mangifera minor|-
| *kurat || the dye produced from Morinda citrifolia|-
| *m(ʷ)ase || wild mulberry, paper mulberry, Broussonetia papyrifera|-
| *ma(i)tagaR(a) || Kleinhovia hospita|-
| *mapuqan || Flueggea flexuosa (?)
|-
| *maqota || Dysoxylum spp.
|-
| *maRakita || the putty nut, probably Parinari laurina and Parinari glaberrima|-
| *maRako || Trichospermum peekelii|-
| *mari(a)sapa || Syzygium sp.
|-
| *molis || citrus fruit or citrus-like fruit, perhaps Clymenia polyandra|-
| *mʷala(q)u || Glochidion philippicum|-
| *mʷalak (?) || spider lily, Crinum asiaticum|-
| *mʷaña || Pandanus sp., perhaps Pandanus conoideus|-
| *mʷapo(q) || taro, Colocasia esculenta|-
| *mʷaruqe || Dioscorea sp. or perhaps a cultivar of Dioscorea alata|-
| *nipus || Cryptocarya sp.
|-
| *ñoñu || Morinda citrifolia|-
| *olaŋa || Campnosperma brevipetiolatum|-
| *pakum || Pandanus dubius|-
| *pala(ŋ) || cut nut, bush nut, Barringtonia novae-hiberniae (green variety?)
|-
| *paliaRua || a vine, Merremia peltata|-
| *paqo || Heliconia sp.
|-
| *paqu || Kleinhovia hospita|-
| *pasa(r,R) || Vitex cofassus|-
| *pesi || a coastal forest tree, perhaps Pongamia pinnata|-
| *pi(y)uŋ || Miscanthus floridulus|-
| *pijo || cane or reed taxon, including Saccharum spontaneum|-
| *poipoi || Pandanus sp., perhaps Pandanus tectorius|-
| *poka(q) || variety of Malay apple
|-
| *(p,b)oso || kind of taro
|-
| *puRe || taxon of beach creepers; perhaps prototypically Ipomoea grandiflora and Ipomoea pes-caprae
|-
| *pʷa(k,g)e || kind of green vegetable (?)
|-
| *pʷabosi || free-standing small or medium-sized Ficus sp., probably Ficus wassa
|-
| *p(ʷ)asa(r,R) || large Pandanus sp.
|-
| *pʷatika || potato yam, aerial yam, Dioscorea bulbifera
|-
| *p(ʷ)awa(t) || Cerbera spp., probably Cerbera floribunda and Cerbera manghas
|-
| *pʷete || bird's nest fern, Asplenium nidus
|-
| *pʷi(r,R)a || Cananga odorata
|-
| *qarop || Premna spp.
|-
| *qat(V) || Terminalia sp. with edible nut
|-
| *(q,k)atita || the putty nut, probably Parinari laurina and Parinari glaberrima
|-
| *(q)alipa, *lalipa || nut sp., possibly canarium almond, Canarium sp. (?)
|-
| *qope || Gyrocarpus americanus
|-
| *quRis || Spondias cytherea
|-
| *(quta)quta || grass and weeds (generic)
|-
| *rabum || grass
|-
| *Rigi || rosewood, Pterocarpus indicus
|-
| *sabakap || Alstonia scholaris
|-
| *sakup || banana cultivar with long fruit (?)
|-
| *seRa || Ficus sp., perhaps Ficus adenosperma
|-
| *sila || Job's tears, Coix lachryma-jobi
|-
| *tamanu || Calophyllum sp.
|-
| *taŋa || Ficus tinctoria
|-
| *tapi(l) || puzzlenut tree, Xylocarpus granatum (?)
|-
| *tapoRa || a nut-bearing tree sp.
|-
| *tawasi || Rhus taitensis
|-
| *toRu || Cordia subcordata
|-
| *udu(r,R) || Dioscorea alata cultivar (?)
|-
| *wasa || Abelmoschus manihot; green vegetables in general
|-
| *wasi-wasi || Abroma augusta
|-
| *yaŋo || turmeric, Curcuma longa
|}

Proto-Western Oceanic plant terms with no known external cognates (22 reconstructions)

{| class="wikitable sortable"
! Proto-Oceanic !! Meaning
|-
| *bara || Macaranga spp.
|-
| *basi || mango
|-
| *baul || mangrove, Rhizophora sp. (?)
|-
| *bʷana || Intsia bijuga
|-
| *bʷatiq || banana cultivar
|-
| *gobu || Dioscorea sp.
|-
| *ka(p)ul || seed yam
|-
| *kamisa || lesser yam, Dioscorea esculenta
|-
| *kam(ʷ)apaR || Cryptocarya sp.
|-
| *kasuwai || mango
|-
| *kobo || taxon of Macaranga spp.
|-
| *kokoi || mushroom sp.
|-
| *[ku,i]Rim(a,o) || Octomeles sumatrana
|-
| *lapuka || kind of tree with fruit similar to breadfruit, Parartocarpus venenosa (?)
|-
| *m(ʷ)ali || Derris sp.
|-
| *mamisa || lesser yam, Dioscorea esculenta
|-
| *moke || Pandanus sp.
|-
| *mʷa(r,R)e || taxon including Codiaeum variegatum and Cordyline fruticosa
|-
| *nagi || Cordia sp.
|-
| *(s,j)a(q,k)umu || Pandanus sp.
|-
| *tabun || Garcinia sp.
|-
| *tabuqaR || Saccharum edule
|}

Proto-Eastern Oceanic plant terms with no known external cognates (15 reconstructions)

{| class="wikitable sortable"
! Proto-Oceanic !! Meaning
|-
| *bakuRa || Calophyllum sp., probably Calophyllum kajewskii
|-
| *buka || taxon of littoral trees, including Pisonia spp. and Gyrocarpus americanus
|-
| *bulipa || Ficus sp.
|-
| *gama || Finschia cloroxantha
|-
| *(k)a(r,l)adroŋa || Acalypha sp.
|-
| *koka || tree sp., Bischofia javanica
|-
| *mabʷe || Tahitian chestnut, Inocarpus fagifer
|-
| *melo || Elaeocarpus angustifolius
|-
| *milo || Thespesia populnea
|-
| *mʷa(q)ele || a cycad, Cycas rumphii
|-
| *pakalo, *pʷakala (?) || Hibiscus sp.
|-
| *paRage || Pangium edule
|-
| *pinuaq || a nut tree, perhaps Canarium sp. (?)
|-
| *rako || Heliconia sp., usually Heliconia indica
|-
| *sinu || taxon of shrubs whose sap causes irritation, including species of Phaleria
|}

Proto-Remote Oceanic plant terms with no known external cognates (6 reconstructions)

{| class="wikitable sortable"
! Proto-Oceanic !! Meaning
|-
| *buavu || Hernandia sp.
|-
| *maRi || breadfruit
|-
| *sasaRu || Abelmoschus manihot
|-
| *vaRo || Neisosperma oppositifolium
|-
| *vuba || kind of vine, probably Derris elliptica
|-
| *wasi-wasi || Sterculia vitiensis
|}

Blust and Trussel (2020)
Selected reconstructed Proto-Oceanic terms of various plants from the Austronesian Comparative Dictionary:

{| class="wikitable sortable"
! Proto-Oceanic !! Common name !! Scientific name
|-
| *kalaqabusi || a shrub || Acalypha sp.
|-
| *piRaq₂ || wild taro, elephant-ear or itching taro || Alocasia spp.
|-
| *sabakap || a tree || Alstonia scholaris
|-
| *putun₁ || a shore tree || Barringtonia spp.
|-
| *que || rattan || Calamus sp.
|-
| *pitaquR || a shore tree || Calophyllum inophyllum
|-
| *kaŋaRi || tree with edible nut, the Canarium almond || Canarium commune
|-
| *(q)alipa || a nut tree || Canarium sp.
|-
| *aRu || a shore tree || Casuarina equisetifolia
|-
| *talos || taro || Colocasia esculenta
|-
| *toRu || a tree || Cordia subcordata
|-
| *aŋo || turmeric || Curcuma longa
|-
| *punat || a plant used to stun fish || Derris elliptica
|-
| *tupa₂ || fish poison || Derris spp.
|-
| *pwatika || potato yam, aerial yam || Dioscorea bulbifera
|-
| *rarap || a tree with dense clusters of red flowers, the Indian coral tree || Erythrina indica
|-
| *buRat || a tree with sweet-smelling flowers || Fagraea berteroana
|-
| *pail || a plant || Falcataria moluccana
|-
| *taŋa₃ || a shrub with edible figs || Ficus tinctoria
|-
| *baka₂ || kind of banyan tree || Ficus sp.
|-
| *pwano-pwano || a plant || Guettarda speciosa
|-
| *paqo || a plant || Heliconia spp.
|-
| *kuRun; *pitu₂ || sword grass || Imperata cylindrica
|-
| *ipi₂ || the ‘Tahitian chestnut’ || Inocarpus fagiferus or Inocarpus edulis
|-
| *puRe₂ || beach creepers || including Ipomoea grandiflora and Ipomoea pes-caprae
|-
| *pau || a plant || Kleinhovia hospita
|-
| *karat₂ || a small stinging plant || perhaps Laportea interrupta
|-
| *latoŋ, *la-latoŋ, *salatoŋ, *silatoŋ || stinging nettle || Laportea spp.
|-
| *piRu || fan palm || Licuala rumphii
|-
| *pinuan || a tree || Macaranga spp.
|-
| *koka || a tree || Macaranga spp., Euphorbiaceae
|-
| *koRa || wild mango || Mangifera minor
|-
| *paliaRua || a vine || Merremia peltata
|-
| *gurat || a tree with roots that furnish a red dye || Morinda citrifolia tree
|-
| *kurat || the dye produced from the Morinda citrifolia || Morinda citrifolia dye
|-
| *ñoñu || tree with inedible white fruit and root that yields a useful dye || Morinda citrifolia tree
|-
| *paoq (ʔ) || a tree || Ochrosia oppositifolia
|-
| *mwaña || pandanus sp. || probably Pandanus conoideus
|-
| *kiRe || a pandanus || Pandanus odoratissimus; a mat made from the leaves of this plant
|-
| *katita || putty nut || Parinari laurinum
|-
| *pu-pulu || betel pepper || Piper betle
|-
| *pesi || coastal tree || perhaps Pongamia pinnata
|-
| *tawasi || a tree || Rhus taitensis
|-
| *pijo || kind of reed or cane || including Saccharum spontaneum
|-
| *kapika, *kapiku || the Malay apple || Syzygium malaccense
|-
| *talise₁ || a shore tree with edible nuts || Terminalia catappa
|-
| *pasa(r,R) || a woody plant or tree || Vitex cofassus
|}

Example sentences
From Lynch, Ross, and Crowley (2002):

See also
 Proto-Polynesian language
 Proto-Austronesian language
 Proto-Malayo-Polynesian language
 Proto-Philippine language

Notes

References

 
 
 
 
 

The lexicon of Proto Oceanic: The culture and environment of ancestral Oceanic society. Volume 3: Plants. 2008. Pacific Linguistics 599

Further reading
Ross, Malcolm; Pawley, Andrew; Osmond, Meredith (eds). The lexicon of Proto Oceanic: The culture and environment of ancestral Oceanic society. 7 volumes.
Volume 1: Material culture. 1998. Pacific Linguistics C-152.
Volume 2: The physical environment. 2003. Pacific Linguistics 545.
Volume 3: Plants. 2008. Pacific Linguistics 599.
Volume 4: Animals. 2011. Pacific Linguistics 621.
Volume 5: People: body and mind. 2016. Asia-Pacific Linguistics (A-PL) 28.
Volume 6: People: society (forthcoming).
Volume 7: Lexicon of Proto Oceanic in summary (forthcoming).

External links
A detailed presentation and bibliography for Oceanic languages (by John Bowden)
The Oceanic Lexicon Project, a research project by Andrew Pawley, Malcolm Ross and Meredith Osmond.

Oceanic languages
Oceanic